Michael Franklin Harcourt, OC (born January 6, 1943) served as the 30th premier of British Columbia from 1991 to 1996, and before that as the 34th mayor of Vancouver, BC's largest city, from 1980 to 1986.

Early life and education 
Harcourt was student council president at Sir Winston Churchill Secondary School and studied at the University of British Columbia, where he graduated BA and LLB. He founded and became the first director (1969–71) of the Vancouver Community Legal Assistance Society, reputedly Canada's first community law office.

Municipal politics 
Harcourt served as a Vancouver alderman from 1973 to 1980. He was first elected as a member of The Electors' Action Movement (TEAM). He was Mayor of Vancouver from 1980 to 1986. As mayor, his term in office was dominated by planning for Expo 86, an event that saw many new developments come to the city, and an event he adamantly opposed coming to the City in the first place.

Provincial politics and premiership 
He was first elected to the British Columbia Legislature in the 1986 British Columbia provincial election. He became the leader of the British Columbia New Democratic Party (NDP) and the Leader of the Official Opposition in the following year. He was considered to be a moderate within the ranks of his social democratic party.

In the 1991 provincial election, Harcourt led the NDP back to power, defeating the Social Credit party led by Rita Johnston. That marked the second time that the NDP had ever been in power in BC and the first since 1975.

On taking office, Harcourt's government increased the basic rate of social assistance from $500/month to $525/month, a 5% increase. By 1993, it had reached $535/month, coupled with increases in other rates and a relaxation of means testing of applicants. As Ralph Klein introduced severe spending cuts in neighbouring Alberta, Harcourt accused him in December 1993 of driving Albertan welfare recipients into British Columbia. An increase in out-of-province applications for income assistance and surge in welfare rolls and spending (The Vancouver Sun noted in 1993 that almost 10% of the population were claiming social assistance), coupled with a shift towards an intolerant view of welfare fraud in Canadian politics, affected the government's standing. A controversial news story about welfare fraud among British Columbia's Somali Canadian community, after the government had denied that system abuse was taking place, further hurt its standing.

Harcourt reacted by abandoning his social democratic policy and moving to the right on welfare. He fired Joan Smallwood as Minister of Social Services, replaced her with Joy MacPhail, reduced welfare rates, and made it more difficult for families to claim assistance. Announcing the policy shift in September 1993, he infamously described it as a crackdown on "cheats, deadbeats and varmints." He later expressed regret for those comments by blaming a "relentless" coverage of welfare fraud causes by the media for the action. The resulting BC Benefits welfare reform package, which included budget cuts, new restrictions, and a reduction in the basic rate to $500/month, the same it had been when Harcourt took office, proved hard to accept for the NDP and had a lasting effect on its reputation by hampering its attempts to condemn later governments for undertaking similar welfare crackdowns.

The NDP government under Harcourt entered into a contract with Carrier Lumber Ltd. to build roads and construct new mills to handle an increased volume of wood because of the infestation of the mountain pine beetle. On May 13, 1992, Mr. Harcourt ignored the contract between his government and Carrier Lumber Ltd. and promised several First Nations that no timber would be harvested and that no roads would be built without their agreement.  Phillip Halkett, deputy minister of forests, testified at trial, "The Premier had no authority to make that promise." The courts award Carrier Lumber Ltd. $156,000,000 and ruled that there had been a deliberate attempt to destroy the company and that government officials had conspired to withhold 2,000 pages of documents in an attempt to defeat Carrier's damage suit. Justice Glenn Parrett of the Supreme Court of British Columbia in his reasons stated of the NDP government, "It is difficult to conceive of a more compelling and cynical example of duplicity and bad faith."

Harcourt resigned as premier in February 1996 as the result of "Bingogate," a scandal in which an NDP member, former BC MLA and MP, David Stupich, used money raised by a charity bingo to fund the party. While it was determined by a BC Ministry of Justice Special Prosecutor that Harcourt was not directly responsible for the scandal, he took political responsibility for it. He was succeeded as premier by Glen Clark, who also ended up resigning as the result of another scandal.

Harcourt's challenges as premier, with both the legislature and the media, were chronicled in the Vancouver journalist Daniel Gawthrop's Highwire Act: Power, Pragmatism, and the Harcourt Legacy, which was published shortly after his resignation as the NDP was preparing for the leadership convention in which Clark was named his successor.

Post-politics 
After serving as premier, Harcourt became associated with the University of British Columbia (UBC). He was involved in research relating to sustainable development and cities.

Harcourt was severely injured in a near-fatal fall at his cottage on Pender Island in November 2002, which resulted in a severe spinal-cord injury. After 13 years as a partial quadriplegic, he describes 20 percent of his body as still paralyzed. The former premier received a widespread outpouring of empathy and support from his fellow British Columbians and his rapid recovery astonished doctors. He spent several months at the world-renowned facility GF Strong. He later published a book about his ordeal, called Plan B.

He was named as a special advisor to Prime Minister Paul Martin on cities on December 12, 2003.

His latest book, City Making in Paradise, was released in August 2007.

In November 2007, he received an honorary doctoral degree in law (LL.D) from UBC. In February 2009 he was appointed associate director of the new UBC Continuing Studies Centre for Sustainability, where he will contribute to the development of educational programs that emphasize practical knowledge in tackling climate change and other sustainability issues.

In 2008, Harcourt became a key adviser to then newly-elected mayor of Vancouver Gregor Robertson, including topics about transparency and transportation.

In 2011, Harcourt joined five other former mayors of Vancouver to urge the federal government to halt its efforts to close Insite.

In the January 31st, 2014 issue of High Country News Harcourt stated he was recruited in the 1960s by an activist group to oppose a freeway that would have connected the Trans-Canada Highway to downtown Vancouver. 'You've been hired to stop the freeway,' he recalled in the article.

Harcourt revealed in April 2014 that he had allowed his NDP membership to lapse and now considers himself an independent. "I don’t know whether it’s a trial separation or a decree absolute," he told the Globe and Mail in an interview. Harcourt cited several complaints against his former party including former leader Adrian Dix's decision to oppose the Kinder-Morgan pipeline and the party's general disposition against mining, logging and other resource-extraction industries, the party's 2009 opposition to the BC Liberal government's proposed carbon tax, and the 2010 caucus revolt that forced the resignation of then-leader Carole James.

Harcourt had repeatedly supported the legalization of cannabis and in May 2014 announced that he would be an advisor to True Leaf Medicine Inc., a Vernon-based start-up company seeking Health Canada approval to produce and sell medicinal marijuana. Harcourt admitted previous personal use of marijuana in the 1960s and 1970s.

Harcourt sits as an advisor to Canada's Ecofiscal Commission.

References

External links

1943 births
Canadian politicians with disabilities
Canadian cannabis activists
Mike
Lawyers in British Columbia
Leaders of the British Columbia CCF/NDP
Living people
Mayors of Vancouver
Members of the Executive Council of British Columbia
Politicians from Edmonton
Premiers of British Columbia
Peter A. Allard School of Law alumni
20th-century Canadian politicians
Officers of the Order of Canada